Pseudopanax lessonii, or houpara, is a New Zealand native tree belonging to the family Araliaceae.

Description
Houpara is a shrub or tree up to 6 m tall, with stout branches. The leaves are crowded towards the tips of branchlets, and are 3- to 5-foliolate. Juvenile plants have larger leaves than adults. The petioles are 5–15 cm long.

Distribution
Endemic to New Zealand, Houpara's natural range is coastal forest and scrub on the Three Kings Islands and the North Island as far south as Poverty Bay (38°4′S).

Cultivation
Houpara is popular in New Zealand gardens, but is rare in cultivation elsewhere, requiring mild, moist conditions, without extremes of temperature in winter and summer. A number of cultivars have been developed, including 'Gold Splash' which has yellow variegated leaves, and 'Nigra' which has dark purple-brown foliage.

References
 Salmon J T, The Native Trees of New Zealand, AH & AW Reed Ltd, Wellington, New Zealand 1973

External links

Flora of New Zealand, URL:Pseudopanax lessonii. Accessed 16 May 2007.
New Zealand Plant Conservation Network, URL:Pseudopanax lessonii. Accessed 2010-10-04.

lessonii
Trees of New Zealand